El agente 00-P2 (also known as Agent Macaw: Shaken & Stirred) is a 2009 Mexican animated action-spy-comedy film produced by Ánima Estudios. The film features the voices of Mexican actors Jaime Camil, Silvia Pinal, and Dulce María.

It was released in theaters on February 13, 2009 in Mexico. This film references blockbuster spy films, such as James Bond and Mission: Impossible.

Synopsis
Tambo Macaw, an overweight macaw who works as a janitor at the Central Intelligentus Animalus (CIA) dreams of becoming a secret agent. The opportunity arises when he is assigned, by mistake, the most important mission in the agency's history; stop the wicked plans of Mamá Osa and her evil organization. Tambo is helped by Jacinto Tortugo, an old turtle who is in charge of the technology lab in the agency and is one of Tambo's few friends. The couple journeys into the coolest and craziest adventure ever, which will lead them to faraway places where they'll face weird and dangerous foes. Our heroes will have to use their limited resources —in Tambo's case, his limited intelligence— to save the world from an icy extinction.

Cast
Jaime Camil as Tambo Macaw, a macaw
Dulce María as Molly Cocatu, female macaw
Silvia Pinal as Mamá Osa, a polar bear
Ana Paula Fogarty as a younger Mamá Osa
Mario Castañeda as Gino Tutifrutti, a chameleon
Luis Alfonso Mendoza as Jacinto Tortugo, a turtle
Rogelio Guerra as Jefe Lipo, a hippo
José F. Lavat as Yunque, an ox

Box office
El agente 00-P2 earned $4.4 million pesos ($0.3 million USD) on its opening weekend and grossed a total of $22.57 million pesos (US$1.5 million) during its theatrical run.

Soundtrack
This film features two hit singles, One Way or Another, performed by Blondie, and Summer Fun, performed by The Barracudas.

See also
James Bond in film

References

External links

2009 films
Flash animated films
Ánima Estudios films
Animated films about birds
Mexican animated films
Mexican children's films
2009 animated films
2009 comedy films
2000s Spanish-language films
2000s Mexican films